Rebecca Richards is the Civil Liberties and Privacy Officer at the National Security Agency.

She graduated from George Washington University. She was Senior Director for Privacy Compliance at the Department of Homeland Security. She worked on the US-EU Safe Harbor accord.

References

External links

Year of birth missing (living people)
Living people
George Washington University alumni
National Security Agency people
United States Department of Homeland Security officials